Roy Taylor  is a physician, diabetologist, and author who is currently the Director of Newcastle Magnetic Resonance Centre. His Scopus h-index is 54.

Taylor has worked on identifying the cause of type 2 diabetes and in furthering retinal screening for diabetic eye disease in the United Kingdom.

Taylor qualified in medicine at the University of Edinburgh, and is Professor of Medicine and Metabolism at Newcastle University and Newcastle Hospitals NHS Trust. He has been conducting research on type 2 diabetes since 1978. He founded the Newcastle Magnetic Resonance Centre in 2006 to apply innovative techniques to study in all medical specialities.

In 2011 Taylor showed that type 2 diabetes was a simple, reversible condition of excess fat within liver and pancreas. This led to a series of studies, most recently the Diabetes Remission Clinical Trial which demonstrated that type 2 diabetes can be reversed to normal in Primary Care and that the underlying pathophysiological changes were durable. He has also shown that the whole pancreas is small and irregularly shaped in type 2 diabetes, and that it returns to normal very gradually during 2 years of remission from type 2 diabetes.

Taylor developed the system now used throughout the United Kingdom for screening for diabetic eye disease, which has resulted in a major reduction in blindness due to diabetes across the UK. He has produced books and other teaching aids for retinal screeners — a profession which he pioneered — co-founding the British Association of Retinal Screeners, developing a training programme and recognised professional qualification. He is also the author of a training manual for retinal screeners, The Handbook of Retinal Screening.

In addition, he developed the Newcastle Obstetric Medical service and advanced clinical management in diabetes during pregnancy and also in severe hyperemesis.

He is the author of Life Without Diabetes, a popular guide to understanding and reversing type 2 diabetes and achieving lasting remission.

Taylor was appointed Member of the Order of the British Empire (MBE) in the 2023 New Year Honours for services to diabetic research.

Major publications 

>

References 

Academics of Newcastle University
Year of birth missing (living people)
Living people
British diabetologists
Alumni of the University of Edinburgh
Members of the Order of the British Empire